The men's track time trial cycling event at the 1932 Summer Olympics took place on August 1. Nine cyclists from nine nations competed, with each nation limited to one cyclist. The event was won by Dunc Gray of Australia, the nation's first victory in the men's track time trial. Gray was the first man to win two medals in the event, adding the gold to his 1928 bronze. Jacques van Egmond gave the Netherlands its second consecutive silver medal in the event. Charles Rampelberg of France took bronze, the nation's first medal since 1896 (36 years but only two appearances of the event before).

Background

This was the third appearance of the event, which had previously been held in 1896 and 1928. It would be held every Games until being dropped from the programme after 2004. The only returning cyclist from 1928 was bronze medalist Dunc Gray of Australia. Gray had the flu shortly before the competition, but received a "miracle drug" from his coach containing brandy.

Mexico and the United States each made their debut in the men's track time trial. France and Great Britain each made their third appearance, having competed at every appearance of the event.

Competition format

The event was a time trial on the track, with each cyclist competing separately to attempt to achieve the fastest time. Each cyclist raced one kilometre from a standing start.

Records

The following was the Olympic record prior to the competition.

* World records were not tracked by the UCI until 1949.

Dunc Gray set the new Olympic record at 1:13.0. The top five cyclists all beat the old record.

Schedule

Results

References

Track cycling at the 1932 Summer Olympics
Cycling at the Summer Olympics – Men's track time trial